08 Stockholm Human Rights is a Swedish basketball club located in Stockholm that has a men's and women's team.

The club was established in 1996 when two of the most successful basketball associations, Alvik BK (established 1956) and the South YMCA Basketball (established 1949), collaborated to form 08 Stockholm. The reason for the name of "Human Rights" is because of the club's active social commitment to using basketball as a tool to work against racism, for social inclusion and to educate their players and leaders in the club's core values.

Since their inception in 1996–97, the club has been very successful with both their men's and women's teams winning the league championship in 2001. The women's team has subsequently won three national championships (2003, 2007, 2010) since then, while the men's team previously won the inaugural Swedish-Finnish league championship in 1999. In 2013, the men's team was removed from the Basketligan because it didn't meet requirements set by the league. The club continued in the Superettan.

Players

Current roster

Depth chart

Notable past players
 Kodi Augustus
 Jerel Blassingame
 Rodney Hamilton
 /  Erkan Inan
 Landry Kosmalski
 Martin Müürsepp
 Ronaldas Rutkauskas
 Tolga Tekinalp

References

External links 
 

Defunct basketball teams in Sweden
basketball
Women's basketball teams in Sweden
Basketball teams established in 1996